The Indus River flows in India, Pakistan and Tibet.

Indus may also refer to:

Businesses and organizations

Aviation 
 Air Indus, a Pakistani airline
 Indus Air, a defunct Indian airline
 Indus Airways, a domestic air carrier based in Delhi, India
 IndUS Aviation, a Texas-based manufacturer of light sport aircraft

Media 
 Indus TV, a TV channel based in Pakistan
 Indus Media Group, a media group based in Pakistan

Other fields 
 Indus Capital Partners, a hedge fund based in New York City
 Indus Health Plus, an Indian health care provider
 Indus Hospital and Health Network, a tertiary care multidisciplinary hospital and healthcare system in Pakistan
 Indus Refinery Project, a proposed petroleum refinery to be located near Karachi, Pakistan
 Indus Trust, a non-profit educational trust that focuses on training research and allied activities for underprivileged communities in India
 Toyota Indus, an automobile manufacturer based in Karachi, Pakistan

People 
 Julius Indus, a 1st century nobleman of the Gaulish Treveri tribe and ally of the Romans
 Indus Arthur (1941–1984), American actress

Places 
 Indus, Alberta, Canada, a hamlet
 Indas or Indus, a town in Bankura, West Bengal, India
 Indus (community development block), an administrative division in Bankura, West Bengal, India
 Indus, Minnesota, United States, an unincorporated community
 Indus Vallis, area on Mars

Rivers 
Dalaman River, Turkey, known as Indus in classical antiquity
Indus River (Hong Kong) or Ng Tung River

Schools 
 Indus University,  Pakistan
 Indus University (Gujarat), Rancharda, Ahmedabad, Gujarat, India
 Indus College of Engineering Coimbatore, Coimbatore, Tamil Nadu, India
 Indus Valley School of Art and Architecture, a not-for-profit, degree-awarding institution in Karachi, Sindh, Pakistan

Ships
 , various Royal Navy ships and two shore establishments
 HMIS Indus (U67), a Grimsby-class sloop of the Royal Indian Navy launched in 1934 and sunk during the Second World War in 1942
 , a converted Liberty ship in service in World War II, lead ship of the Indus-class net cargo ships
 , a number of steamships with this name
 Indus (ship), various ships

Other uses 
 Indus (constellation), a southern constellation
 Indus Highway, a national highway in Pakistan
 Battle of the Indus, a 1221 victory for Genghis Khan over Shah Jalal ad-Din Mingburnu of the Khwarezmian Empire
 Indus script, an ancient script of the Indus Valley civilization
 1st Indus Drama Awards, presented in Karachi, Pakistan, in 2005
Indus, a song by Dead Can Dance from Spiritchaser
 Indus, a model of locomotive - see Yorkshire Engine Company Taurus and Indus

See also 
 
 
 Indus Towers, an Indian telecommunications company
 Indus 2, a synchrotron radiation source